Phaphala FM is a South African radio station operating through SABC, South Africa's government owned national broadcaster. Phalaphala broadcasts in the Venda language and can be received mainly in Gauteng and Limpopo provinces. The station's Music format is Middle of the Road Format (MOR) with Mid Tempo Bit.

History
Phalaphala  FM was  born on 2 February 1965 and came into being after a merge between  Radio Venda and Radio Thohoyandou in 1998. The two radio stations of different backgrounds with  the  one being Venda Bantustan origin and the other being a SABC public broadcaster. Radio Thohoyandou had a commercial wing which did broadcast in English and did not have the same license conditions as Radio Venda. The station broadcasts live from Polokwane or Thohoyandou SABC studios . its historical Djs Line up includes the legendary Mpho Nefale, Mbalavhali D, Terry 'Big Dude" Mudau, Dj Lagugga & Many More. It is also known for hosting the biggest music festival called Phalaphala Fm Royal Heritage Festival in Limpopo and throughout South Africa. The station broadcasts out of Limpopo in Tshivenda.

Coverage and frequencies

Broadcast time
24/7

Target audience
Ages 16 – 24 (43%)
Ages 25 – 34 (20%)
Ages 35 – 49 (21%)
Female (51%)
Male (49%)
LSM 1-4 (46.6%)
LSM 5-6 (42.9%)
LSM 7-10 (10.5%)

Listenership figures

References

External links
Phalaphala FM Website
Phalaphala FM Stream
SAARF Website
Sentech Website

Radio stations in South Africa
Mass media in Limpopo